Minas de Matahambre Municipal Museum is a museum located in Minas de Matahambre, Cuba. It was established as a museum on 30 July 1980.

The museum holds about 1,000 objects, mostly related to the economic and social development of the area. There is an important collection of old photographs about the first decades of the village.

See also 
 List of museums in Cuba

References 

Museums in Cuba
Buildings and structures in Pinar del Río Province
Museums established in 1980
1980 establishments in Cuba
20th-century architecture in Cuba